WAPCOS Limited, earlier known as Water and Power Consultancy Services (India) Limited, is an Indian consultancy service provider under the ownership of the Government of India and administrative control of the Ministry of Jal Shakti. The firm provides consultancy services in the fields of water resources, power and infrastructure. Launched in 1969, it is a "Mini Ratna" company with several projects across India, Asia and Africa.

History 
WAPCOS Limited is a "Mini Ratna-I" Public Sector Enterprise under the aegis of the Ministry of Jal Shakti, Department of Water Resources, River Development & Ganga Rejuvenation. Incorporated on June 26, 1969, under the Companies Act, 1956; WAPCOS is a technology-driven Consultancy and Engineering, Procurement and Construction (EPC) organization with strong home country and global presence in the field of Water, Power and Infrastructure sectors. WAPCOS has the requisite experience & expertise to undertake Consultancy & EPC projects of any scale and complexity in the sectors of its operations.

Services 
WAPCOS provides a range of services in the areas of infrastructure development, water resources and power generation. As a consultancy, some of its activities include pre-feasibility studies and feasibility studies, master plans and regional development plans, detailed engineering reports, commissioning and testing, operations and maintenance and capacity building and human resource development in its areas of competence. WAPCOS also provides commissioning services for developmental projects in India and abroad.

Global presence 
WAPCOS has successfully completed/ongoing consultancy assignments in countries covering Asia, Africa, Eurasia, CIS, South America, North America, Oceania & Pacific Islands providing consultancy services in different countries including, Angola, Afghanistan, Belize, Benin, Bhutan, Burundi, Botswana, Cambodia, Cameroon, Central African Republic, Chad, Cuba, DR Congo, Eswatini, Ethiopia, Fiji, Gambia, Ghana, Guinea Conakry, Indonesia, Kenya, Lao PDR, Lesotho, Liberia, Madagascar, Malawi, Maldives, Mongolia, Mozambique, Myanmar, Nepal, Niger, Nigeria, Nicaragua, Papua New Guinea, Rwanda, Senegal, Sierra Leone, Sri Lanka, Suriname, Tanzania, Tajikistan, Togo, Timor Leste, USA, Uganda, Uzbekistan, Vietnam,  Yemen, Zambia,  Zimbabwe

References

External links 
 WAPCOS Limited

Consulting firms of India
Ministry of Water Resources (India)
Indian companies established in 1969
1969 establishments in Delhi